A list of films produced in the Cinema of Austria in the 2010s ordered by year of release. For an alphabetical list of articles on Austrian films see :Category:Austrian films.

References

External links
 Austrian film at the Internet Movie Database
 Austrianfilm.com

2010
Austrain
Films

de:Liste österreichischer Filme